Jack Smith (born March 18, 1973) is a former American professional stock car racing driver. He last competed part-time in the NASCAR Camping World Truck Series, driving the No. 63 for MB Motorsports. Smith has been under an indefinite suspension from NASCAR since November 2011, for violation of the sport's Substance Abuse Policy. Smith was previously suspended in 2010 after attempting to purchase a controlled substance.

References

External links
 

1973 births
NASCAR drivers
Living people